Tailson Pinto Gonçalves (born 5 March 1999), simply known as Tailson, is a Brazilian footballer who plays for Ferroviária, on loan from Santos. Mainly a forward, he can also play as an attacking midfielder.

Club career

Santos
Born in Santo André, São Paulo, Tailson joined Santos' youth setup at the age of nine; in 2014 he left to join Mauaense, but returned to the club in 2015. After appearing in the 2019 Copa São Paulo de Futebol Júnior, he was called up to the first team by manager Jorge Sampaoli.

On 19 April 2019, Tailson left the club after his contract expired. On 5 August, however, after being linked to FC Barcelona, he signed a professional deal with the club.

Tailson made his first team – and Série A – debut on 5 October 2019, starting and scoring the winner in a 1–0 away defeat of Vasco da Gama.

On 12 March 2021, Tailson joined recently relegated side Coritiba on loan for the 2021 campaign. He struggled to make an impact during his spell at the club, and was sent back to his parent club in July.

On 9 August 2021, Tailson moved to Náutico also in the second division, on loan until December. He returned to Santos for the 2022 season, but featured rarely.

On 1 February 2023, Tailson was loaned to Ferroviária until July.

Career statistics

References

External links
Santos FC profile 

1999 births
Living people
Footballers from São Paulo (state)
Brazilian footballers
Association football forwards
Association football utility players
Campeonato Brasileiro Série A players
Campeonato Brasileiro Série B players
Santos FC players
Coritiba Foot Ball Club players
Clube Náutico Capibaribe players
Associação Ferroviária de Esportes players